Sarcocheilichthys davidi is a species of cyprinid fish endemic to China.

It is named in honor of the Catholic missionary and zoologist Armand David (1826-1900), who collected the type specimen.

References

Sarcocheilichthys
Taxa named by Henri Émile Sauvage
Fish described in 1878